Khorat or Korat may refer to:

the informal name of Nakhon Ratchasima town or Nakhon Ratchasima province, Thailand
Khorat Sub-district in Sung Noen district of Nakhon Ratchasima Province
Khorat Plateau, a plateau in the northeastern Isan region of Thailand
Khorat Thai, an ethnic group in Thailand
Korat (RTGS: Khorat), a cat breed originating in Thailand
Korat F.C., a minor football club in Thailand